DWAN (94.3 FM), on-air as DWIZ 94.3, is a radio station owned and operated by Aliw Broadcasting Corporation. The station's studio and transmitter are located at the Citystate Asturias Hotel, South National Highway, Brgy. Tiniguiban, Puerto Princesa.

The station was established on November 28, 2014 under the Home Radio network with call letters DWQP. In November 2015, it switched to a news and talk format under the DWIZ branding.

References

Radio stations in Puerto Princesa
Radio stations established in 2014